Bilateral relations exist & existed between Austria and Russia and their predecessor states. Since October 1955, the Republic of Austria maintains the constitutionally-mandated status of neutrality; the country is a founding member of the Organisation for Economic Co-operation and Development (OEEC). Austria joined the EU in 1995. Russia is a permanent member of the United Nations Security Council, a partner of ASEAN, a member of the Shanghai Cooperation Organisation (SCO), the G20, the Asia-Pacific Economic Cooperation (APEC), the Organization for Security and Co-operation in Europe (OSCE), as well as the leading member state of the Commonwealth of Independent States (CIS), the Collective Security Treaty Organization (CSTO), and the Eurasian Economic Union (EEU).  Both countries are members of the Organization for Security and Co-operation in Europe and the World Trade Organization (WTO).

History

Early history

The lands now part of Austria were once simply a collection of fiefs of the House of Habsburg whose head was also the Holy Roman Emperor from the 15th Century on. The history of Austria in international relations during this time period was synonymous with the foreign policy of the Habsburgs. Russia was more or less uninterested in European affairs before Peter I (r. 1682–1725) but there were contacts between the Holy Roman Emperor and the Tsars of Muscovy the most known of all was the Embassy conducted by Herberstein in the 16th Century. Between these two vast monarchies lay the Polish–Lithuanian Commonwealth and the Ottoman Empire. However, as the Habsburgs expanded their domain (often shortened as "Austria" after its central province, the Archduchy of Austria) south and east and Russia south and west, relations between the two monarchies became vital to European security.

When Peter the Great was proclaimed emperor in 1721, his and his successors' recognition of the imperial title was delayed by the Habsburgs, the other claimant successors of the Roman Empire, until 1742, during the War of Austrian Succession. Russia's entry into European affairs created a recurring alliance between Russia and Austria often directed against the Ottomans and France. Russia and Austria were allies during the War of the Polish Succession (1733–1738), the War of the Austrian Succession (1740–1748), the Seven Years' War (1756–1763), and from 1787 to 1791 the monarchies both waged separates wars against the Ottomans (the Austro-Turkish War (1787-1791) and the Russo-Turkish War (1787–1792)). Both countries participated in the first and third partition of Poland.

The two countries do not border each other until the second partition of Poland. The coming of the French Revolution created ideological solidarity between the absolutist monarchies including Russia and Austria, which both fought against France during the French Revolutionary Wars and the Napoleonic Wars.

Austrian and Russian Empires

In 1804 Austria was proclaimed an Empire and after the Congress of Vienna the great reactionary powers of Europe pledged to work together to keep revolution at bay, and Austria and Russia were the greatest defenders of the Vienna settlement.

After 1815 Austria's policy as set by Klemens von Metternich was based on a  realistic acceptance of Russia's political predominance in Moldavia and Wallachia. He obtained from Tsar Nicholas I some economic concessions during the 1830s. The two powers began to co-operate, with the mutual aim of preserving the status quo.

The Revolutions of 1848 shook the Habsburg lands, and the Hungarian lands declared their independence. Russia intervened by invading Hungary to suppress the revolutions and restore the Habsburg sovereignty.

During the Crimean War Austria maintained a policy of hostile neutrality towards Russia, and, while not going to war, was supportive of the Anglo-French coalition.  This stance deeply angered Nicholas I of Russia and was a serious strain to Russo-Austrian relations thereafter. Although it was Russia that was punished by the Treaty of Paris, in the long run it was Austria that lost the most from the Crimean War despite having barely taken part in it. Having abandoned its alliance with Russia, Austria was diplomatically isolated following the war. Russia subsequently stood aside as Austria was evicted from the Italian and German states. That Russian neutrality towards its former ally clearly contributed to Austrian defeat in the 1866 Austro-Prussian War and its loss of influence in most German-speaking lands.  The Habsburgs therefore gave in to Hungarian demands for autonomy and refounded their state as the Austro-Hungarian Empire.

France, after the Franco-Prussian War and the loss of Alsace-Lorraine, was fervently hostile to Germany, and made an alliance with Russia. The great Slavic empire competed with the newly renamed Austro-Hungarian Empire for an increased role in the Balkans at the expense of the Ottoman Empire, and the foundations were in place for creating the diplomatic alliances that would lead to World War I.

Austria-Hungary and Russian Empire
Austrian officials worried that Russia was adopting a pan-Slavist policy designed to unite all Slavonic-speaking peoples under the Tsar's leadership.  This led them to pursue an anti-Slavic policy domestically and abroad.  The major source of tension between Austria-Hungary and Russia was the so-called Eastern Question: what to do about the weakening Ottoman Empire and its rebellious Christian subjects.

From 1873 to 1887, at least nominally, Austria-Hungary and Russia were again allies with the German Empire in the League of Three Emperors. The 1878 Treaty of Berlin concluded in the aftermath of Russia's victory against the Ottoman Empire in the war of 1877, allowed Austria-Hungary to occupy the Bosnia Vilayet. This, in turn, brought Austria into conflict with the Principality of Serbia, an autonomous (de facto independent) state within the Ottoman Empire under Russian influence and protection.

The visit to Saint Petersburg of Austrian Emperor Franz Joseph and his conference with Nicholas II of Russia in 1897 heralded a secret agreement between the two empires to honor and seek to maintain the status quo in the Balkans, which was in line with Vienna's attempts to forestall an emergence of a large Slavic state in the region. Austria's formal annexation of the Bosnia Vilayet in 1908 dismayed Russia as well as all the other Great Powers and Austria-Hungary's Balkan neighbours, who viewed the action as a violation of the Treaty of Berlin. While Russia eventually backed down, relations between the two Empires were permanently damaged. The lasting result was bitter enmity between Austria-Hungary on one side and Serbia and Russia on the other.

Following the assassination of Archduke Franz Ferdinand of Austria by Serb nationalists of the Black Hand secret society on 28 June 1914, Austria delivered the July Ultimatum to Serbia demanding that the Austrian police and military have the right to enter Serbia.  Serbia rejected the ultimatum and on 28 July 1914, Austria-Hungary declared war on Serbia. On August 6, the Emperor Franz Joseph signed the Austro-Hungarian declaration of war on Russia, who had since 1 August been at war with Germany, the ally of Austria. Russia and Austria would fight to the point of exhaustion on the bloody Eastern Front. The war ended with the overthrow of monarchy in both countries, as well as in Germany, and the dissolution of their empires.

Austria and the Soviet Union

Diplomatic relations between Austria and the USSR were established in 1924 and the former Russian Imperial embassy′s building was handed over to the Soviets.

The rump Austrian state left after the war eventually joined with Nazi Germany in the Anschluss, and was therefore part of the German invasion of the Soviet Union.

After the war Austria was occupied by the allied armies, separated from Germany, and divided into four zones of occupation.  The Soviets did not create a separate socialist government in their zone as they did in East Germany.  Instead, Austria was required to sign the Austrian State Treaty of 1955 under which it pledged total neutrality in the Cold War confrontation between the Soviet Union and the U.S.-led West. The treaty also mandates that Austria never seek to unify with other German-speaking nations, and perpetual maintenance of the Soviet War Memorial in Vienna.

In 1968, Austria became the first Western European country to begin imports of natural gas from the Soviet Union. Subsequently, Europe's main gas hub was set up at Baumgarten an der March on Austria's eastern border with Czechoslovakia, now Slovakia.

Republic of Austria and Russian Federation (since 1991)
 
Following the dissolution of the USSR in 1991, the Russian Federation, the successor state to the Soviet Union, went on maintaining a close relationship with Austria.

According to the report Gazprom's European Web, Austria has long been a favorite country for Soviet (now Russian) commerce, banking, and espionage activities. Austrian police sources have in the 2000s stated that the Russian Foreign Intelligence Service (SVR) maintained its largest European station in Vienna.

In 2003, SVR agent Vladimir Alganov was caught in Vienna discussing bribes Russian spies had paid to senior Polish officials.

The former bodyguard of Chechen President Ramzan Kadyrov and prominent critic of the Chechen government, Umar Israilov, who had filed a complaint with the European Court of Human Rights and was about to tell his story to The New York Times, was assassinated in a street of Vienna in January 2009. Oleg Orlov, the director of Moscow's Memorial Human Rights Centre, said "We are deeply alarmed about what appears to be another politically motivated killing of a critic of high-level Russian government officials. [...] In light of the brutal retaliation inflicted on those who speak out on abuses in Chechnya, Israilov's actions were particularly courageous, and his killers and those behind them need to be promptly held to account". Related to the case might be murders of human rights lawyer Stanislav Markelov and journalist Anastasia Baburova - both were interested in Israilov's case.

Thanks to its neutral status, Austria continued to be the venue for spy exchanges as was the case in 2010, when the U.S. and Russia swapped four imprisoned U.S. and UK intelligence assets, who had been convicted in Russia, for 10 Russian agents caught and convicted in the U.S., on the tarmac of Vienna International Airport.

Austria has sought to maintain good relations and close economic cooperation with Russia even after the drastic deterioration of Russia's relationship with the West following the 2014 Ukraine crisis. In December 2016, the FPÖ leader, Heinz-Christian Strache, announced that his party had signed what he called a cooperation agreement with United Russia, Russian president Vladimir Putin’s party. Following the national election in October 2017, the FPÖ entered government as a junior partner of the winner ÖVP headed by Sebastian Kurz. In June 2018, in Vienna at a joint press conference, the Chancellor of Austria Sebastian Kurz stated that he hoped for a gradual rapprochement between the European Union and Russia. However, he mentioned that Austria supports the decisions of Brussels on sanctions against Russia.

Austria was the only major EU country not to expel Russian diplomats in the course of the retaliatory measures undertaken by the West in the aftermath of the poisoning case in Salisbury in March 2018.

Austria was the first foreign country that Russian president Vladimir Putin visited officially in June 2018 following his reelection for the fourth term as president of Russia. In the course of Putin's visit, the CEOs of OMV and Gazprom signed an agreement to extend Russian gas supplies to Austria until 2040, with both Putin and Austrian Chancellor Sebastian Kurz in attendance. The signing occurred at a time when the two countries were marking 50 years of Soviet/Russian gas supplies to Austria.

On 9 November 2018, Austrian Chancellor Sebastian Kurz said that a 70-year-old retired army colonel was believed to have spied for Russia for about thirty years. The officer in question, who was exposed thanks to a tip-off from the UK government, was said to have been engaged in disclosing state secrets to Russia's GRU from 1992 until September 2018. Two days later, Kronen Zeitung reported that for more than a year, Austria's State Prosecution Office Against White Collar Crime and Corruption (Korruptionsstaatsanwaltschaft) had been investigating an employee of the Office for the Protection of the Constitution and Counterterrorism (BVT) who was suspected of spying for Russia. As a result, Austrian foreign minister Karin Kneissl cancelled her visit to Russia that had been slated for early December. Nevertheless, prime minister Kurz, citing Austria's neutrality, said no "unilateral action" would be taken against Russia. Professor Gerhard Mangott of University of Innsbruck commented for the BBC by saying he was surprised the incident had been made public as it is business as usual and a long-standing tradition for Austrian citizens to spy for foreign powers. In early July 2019, an Austrian court extended pre-trial detention of the suspected retired army colonel until 26 August. On 25 July 2019, Austria's Ministry of the Interior said that the suspected colonel's handler had been a Moscow-born GRU officer Igor Egorovich Zaytsev, a Russian national, for whom an international arrest warrant had been issued. In June 2020, the colonel, still unnamed, was freed upon being convicted of spying for GRU for more than 25 years.

In May 2019, Vladimir Putin and Alexander Van der Bellen, the president of Austria, on an official visit to Russia, addressed the constituent meeting of the Sochi Dialogue Civil Society Forum. Following the talks with his Russian counterpart, Alexander Van der Bellen told the press conference that Austria had no intention to quit the Nord Stream 2 project, the mounting U.S. sanctions notwithstanding.

In August 2020, Austria expelled a Russian diplomat following a report accusing him of being involved in industrial espionage. The expulsion was said to be a first in Austria's relations with Russia. The Austrian newspaper Kronen Zeitung reported that the diplomat's illicit activities were exposed after an Austrian who worked in a technology company confessed he had carried out espionage for years on behalf of the Russian, who was his intelligence handler.

In February and March 2022, during the 2022 Russian invasion of Ukraine, Austria supported EU sanctions against Russia, despite still being a militarily neutral country. On 7 March 2022, Putin put Austria on the list of "enemy countries" along with all other countries who supported sanctions against Russia.

On 11 April 2022, Nehammer was the first European leader to visit Putin ever since the invasion to discuss an end of the war.

Education
The Russian Embassy School in Vienna serves Russian children living in that city.

See also
 Austria and Russian intelligence
 Foreign relations of Austria
 Foreign relations of Russia
 Embassy of Austria, Moscow
 Embassy of Russia, Vienna
 Ambassadors of Russia to Austria
 Austria–Soviet Union relations 
 Austria–United States relations
 Russia–European Union relations
 Internationalization of the Danube River
 Austria–Ukraine relations

References

Further reading
 
 
 Cook, Kathrine Schach. "Russia, Austria, and the Question of Italy, 1859–1862." International History Review 2.4 (1980): 542–565. online
 De Madariaga, Isabel. "The secret Austro-Russian treaty of 1781." Slavonic and East European Review 38.90 (1959): 114–145. online
 Dwyer, Philip G. "Self-interest versus the common cause: Austria, Prussia and Russia against Napoleon." Journal of Strategic Studies 31.4 (2008): 605–632.
 Kappeler, Andreas, and J. Besters-Dilger. "The politics of history in contemporary Ukraine: Russia, Poland, Austria, and Europe." in Ukraine on its way to Europe: Interim results of the orange revolution ed by Juliane Besters-Dilger (Peter Lang Frankfurt aM, 2009) pp. 217–232.
 Korff, Sergeĭ Aleksandrovich. Russia's Foreign Relations during the last half century (Macmillan, 1922) online.
 McHugh, James T. "Last of the enlightened despots: A comparison of President Mikhail Gorbachev and Emperor Joseph II." Social Science Journal 32.1 (1995): 69–85. online
 Mayer, Matthew Z. "The Price for Austria's Security: Part I—Joseph II, the Russian Alliance, and the Ottoman War, 1787–1789." International History Review 26.2 (2004): 257–299. online
 Menning, Bruce. "Russian Military Intelligence, July 1914: What St. Petersburg Perceived and Why It Mattered." Historian 77.2 (2015): 213–268.
 Šedivýý, Miroslav. "From Hostility to Cooperation? Austria, Russia and the Danubian Principalities 1829––40." Slavonic & East European Review 89.4 (2011): 630-661 online.
 Williamson, Samuel R. Austria-Hungary and the origins of the First World War (Macmillan International Higher Education, 1990).
 24.08.2020 00:30, Russischer Diplomat muss Österreich verlassen, krone.at

Sources

External links

 
Russia
Bilateral relations of Russia

de:Österreichisch-sowjetische Beziehungen